The Great Fingall Mine office is a heritage listed building in Day Dawn (near Cue), within Western Australia's Goldfields. It was built from stone in the Federation Italianate architectural style, during the Western Australian gold rushes, . The single-storey structure was used as the administrative and assay offices for the Great Fingall Consolidated Gold Mining Company.

The mine office, and eventually the entire town of Day Dawn, were abandoned following the closure in 1918 of the adjacent Great Fingall Mine and the outbreak of World War One.

The mine office has significant heritage value as the only substantial building left in Day Dawn, and as a rare example of co-located administrative and assay offices. The condition has declined due to decades without any use, but remains generally sound, with the only alterations being the removal of verandahs, deterioration related to exposure to weather, and vandalism.

The Great Fingall Mine reopened in the mid-1990s. There were initially concerns about the mining operation causing further deterioration to the historic building, due to flyrock from blasting, or of a wall collapse due to the closeness of the open cut pit, but by 1997 the threat was assessed as having passed. By 2020, the growth of the mine to within  of the building was endangering it – the gradual erosion of the edge could cause the mining office to slip into the mine.

References

Gold mining in Western Australia
State Register of Heritage Places in the Shire of Cue